Frontiers of Alusia is a 1981 role-playing game supplement for DragonQuest published by SPI.

Contents
Frontiers of Alusia is a wilderness campaign map designed specifically for use with DragonQuest, though usable with nearly any other fantasy role-playing game.

Reception
William A. Barton reviewed Frontiers of Alusia in The Space Gamer No. 42. Barton commented that "Frontiers of Alusia looks to be a handy playing aid for nearly any FRPG and should prove particularly useful to DragonQuest players looking for a setting for their campaign."

References

DragonQuest
Fantasy role-playing game supplements
Role-playing game supplements introduced in 1981